Mantidactylus ulcerosus is a species of frog in the family Mantellidae.
It is endemic to Madagascar.
Its natural habitats are subtropical or tropical moist lowland forests, subtropical or tropical moist montane forests, rivers, swamps, freshwater marshes, intermittent freshwater marshes, and heavily degraded former forest.
It is threatened by habitat loss.

References

ulcerosus
Endemic frogs of Madagascar
Taxonomy articles created by Polbot
Amphibians described in 1880